Michael Gale may refer to:
 Michael Gale (footballer), Australian rules footballer
 Michael Denis Gale, British plant geneticist
 Mike Gale, American basketball player
 Bob Gale (Michael Robert Gale), American screenwriter, producer and film director